PosteMobile S.p.A. is an Italian telecommunications company owned by Poste Italiane S.p.A., which operates in the mobile telephony sector as mobile virtual network operator (Full MVNO) on the Wind network and, since 2018, it also offers fixed telephony and Internet services.

Since December 2016, PosteMobile is the title sponsor of the Italian Lega Basket Serie A (LBA).

The Ministry of Economic Development has assigned the operator PosteMobile five decades of the prefix 371 (371-1, 371-3, 371-4, 371-5, 371-6).

History 
On April 5, 2007, the agreement between Poste Italiane and Vodafone was made official which envisages the birth of PosteMobile S.p.A. It was precisely on November 15 of the same year that the company began to enter the mobile phone sector, starting the sale of SIM cards initially available only to postal employees. On November 26, PosteMobile launches its first public offer: after about 10 days from the launch, customers increased to reach 40,000 people. And at the end of 2007 the share of approximately 140,000. On 11 April 2008 PosteMobile launched its mobile banking services called "Simplify" thanks to the technical support of Gemalto, later renamed SIMply BancoPosta and in 2009, precisely on 7 July, PosteMobile announced that it had reached one million customers.

References

External links
 

Telecommunications in Italy
Mobile phone companies of Italy
Mobile virtual network operators